Dysard Dageago (born 24 October 1994) is a Nauruan sprinter. In 2017, he competed in the men's 100 metres event at the 2017 World Athletics Championships in London, United Kingdom. He competed in the preliminary round and he did not advance to compete in the heats.

References

External links 
 

Living people
1994 births
Place of birth missing (living people)
Nauruan male sprinters
World Athletics Championships athletes for Nauru